"Into the Wild" is a song by American Christian singer-songwriter Josh Baldwin that was released via Bethel Music on May 7, 2021, as the second single from his fourth studio album, Evidence (2020). Baldwin co-wrote the song with Bobby Strand, Ethan Hulse, and Steffany Gretzinger.

"Into the Wild" peaked at No. 35 on Billboard's US Hot Christian Songs chart.

Background
On September 16, 2020, Bethel Music announced that "Into the Wild" would be the next single following "Evidence" with its release slated for September 18, 2020, in the lead-up to the release of Baldwin's album Evidence set for October 2, 2020. "Into the Wild" was subsequently released as the album's first promotional single, accompanied with its music video.

Composition

Commercial performance
"Into the Wild" debuted at number 26 on the US Christian Airplay chart dated July 3, 2021.

Music video
The music video of "Into the Wild" was released on September 18, 2020, through Bethel Music's YouTube channel.

Charts

Release history

References

External links
  on PraiseCharts
 

2020 songs
2021 singles
Contemporary Christian songs
Songs written by Ethan Hulse